Shinobi Shaw, also known as a Black King of the Hellfire Club, is a supervillain appearing in American comic books published by Marvel Comics. The character is usually depicted as an adversary of the X-Men and their affiliated teams. Created by Chris Claremont, Jim Lee and Whilce Portacio, the character first appeared in X-Factor #67 (June 1991). He is the son of the former Black King Sebastian Shaw and is a mutant with the ability to control the density of his own body.

Fictional character biography 
Shinobi is the adopted son of Sebastian Shaw, the leader of the Hellfire Club. In his first appearance, Shaw is revealed to be involved in the Upstarts, a group made up of Siena Blaze, Fabian Cortez, Trevor Fitzroy and probationary members Andreas and Andrea Strucker (of Fenris), who were manipulated by the Gamemaster and originally Selene to competed in a "game" which involved killing prominent mutants and garnering points from each kill. Shinobi picked his own father as a target and set about to murder him, since Shinobi grew up to hate his father for the treatment he had received in his hands. First he engaged in a series of financial machinations to ruin his father, he managed to buy Shaw Industries, his father's collection of companies, from under his nose. After bankrupting him, Shinobi boldly confronted his father in Sebastian's private chalet in Switzerland and revealed how he now owned Shaw Industries. He also cruelly teased his father by suggesting that perhaps the late Harry Leland, Sebastian's colleague from the Hellfire Club, could be his real father, on the basis of Shinobi and Harry's similar powers. Finally, Shinobi reached into Sebastian's chest and gave him a coronary attack. The chalet was then obliterated in an explosion, with Shinobi seemingly the sole survivor. Shaw is able to briefly take control of the Hellfire Club, assuming the mantle of Black King. In his early years, Shinobi often surrounded himself with scantily-clad men and women.

Shinobi's elimination of his father put him ahead in the ranking of the Upstarts, making him the frontrunner in the game. Shinobi relished in his newfound wealth and glory, and his various servants catered to his every whim in his luxurious apartments in New York and Tokyo. However, his rival Upstart, Trevor Fitzroy, coveted the top spot of the Upstarts for himself. With a new, improved batch of Sentinels, he orchestrated the massacre of most of the Reavers, Hellions and Emma Frost, the White Queen of the Hellfire Club. Fitzroy brought the lifeless Frost to Shinobi as proof and demanded to be handed over Sebastian's ring, which Shinobi wore as a symbol of power. When Shinobi refused to relinquish it, Fitzroy unflinchingly cut off Shinobi's finger which carried the ring and seized it. After Shinobi had his own Sentinels reattach his finger, he hunted down Fitzroy and located him in his secret base in an iceberg in the Arctic Circle. Shinobi's men captured Fitzroy and Shinobi reclaimed the ring. He also gleefully informed Fitzroy that the Gamesmaster, the coordinator of the Upstarts game, had ruled this altercation between the two men in favor of Shinobi. Upon learning that the X-Men were also in Fitzroy's base at the moment, Shinobi attempted to further his Upstarts achievements and wipe out the entire team with some explosions he orchestrated, however, he failed.

Shinobi's leading position among the Upstarts was short-lived. Fellow competitor Fabian Cortez claimed to have killed Magneto and became the frontrunner in the game. When Cortez strongly demurred at the inclusion of a human, Graydon Creed, among the Upstarts, Shinobi tried to calm him down by reminding him that the Upstarts originated as an escapist game of fun for rich, bored and spoiled children.

During another of these games, the Upstarts target the surviving members of the New Mutants and the Hellions, but are defeated by the combined forces of X-Force and the New Warriors. 

Around the same time, eager to return the Inner Circle to its former glory, Shaw approaches Betsy Braddock and Warren Worthington, attempting to convince them to become a part of the Inner Circle. Both X-Men refuse, however. He also tried to enlist Storm under Candra's orders as a member, but she also refused. Still operating with the Hellfire Club, he organizes an assassination attempt on Daily Bugle editor J. Jonah Jameson, but his power play is thwarted by Spider-Man and a handful of X-Men.

After he learned that his father was alive, Shinobi presumably in fear of retaliation for his assassination attempt, deserted all of his inherited positions and returned to a more secretive mode of life, allowing Sebastian to take control of the Hellfire Club. Shinobi then worked with Spiral and Mindmeld as they experiment on Karma's siblings. However, his personal assassin Clear-Cut betrays him and aids X-Force in defeating him.

As a result of the Scarlet Witch's actions, nearly all of the mutants in the entire world were stripped of their powers. Shinobi is confirmed as being one of a limited number of mutants who retained their powers following the 2005 "Decimation" storyline. 

When Selene attempted to rise to goddesshood, it was revealed that Shinobi was at some point found and killed by his father, as he was resurrected by Selene with the techno-organic virus and sent with Harry Leland to kill his father and Donald Pierce. Selene was ultimately defeated and Shinobi's fate was left uncertain, as it was unknown if he was among the mutants teleported to Genosha by Blink to serve as a sacrifice to Selene or if he was among those that managed to escape Utopia. 

Shinobi is later revealed to be alive and assembled the Upstarts again to kill the Nasty Boys, in order to lure the X-Men out. The Upstarts are quickly neutralized and after discovering the X-Men were unknowingly working for Emma Frost, Shinobi used his own mutant powers to commit suicide by phasing his hand through his head before muttering that Emma Frost will not get him.

In the 2019 relaunch of the X-Men comics, Shinobi was resurrected on Krakoa by The Five and placed under the care of his father, who appointed him the Black Bishop of the Hellfire Trading Company. Shinobi was unaware of the circumstances of his death, and his father told him that Emma Frost and Kate Pryde conspired to kill him.

After Kate Pride is killed and Shaw's betrayal is revealed through Lockheed, Emma immediately calls Callisto to go after Shinobi, who was having a meeting with Christian Frost. With Cal as her bodyguard, Emma reads Shinobi's mind and finds out that he was unaware of his father's intentions. Emma later makes a dig at Sebastian by questioning his parentage to Shinobi.

It is revealed that Shinobi is in fact Harry Leland's illegitimate son.

Powers and abilities 
Shinobi Shaw is a mutant who can alter his body's density from diamond-hard to intangible. He usually uses it as a means of escape, but he can also use the intangibility to reach into an opponent's heart and induce a heart attack, without any adverse effects on Shaw himself.

Other versions 
In the grim future timeline known as Days of Future Past, Shinobi also succeeded his late father in the leadership of the Hellfire Club. He worked with Betsy Braddock (as his Red Queen) and Wolverine's adopted daughter Amiko as his personal assassin. Amidst a United States demolished by the Sentinels, Shinobi abducted Scarlet Witch and had her brought to the Club. Shinobi tied Wanda with a machine that would amplify her reality-warping powers and wreak chaos all over the globe.

His plans were thwarted by Scarlet Witch's father, Magneto. Magnus infiltrated the base, along with Wolverine and other mutant allies. He killed Shinobi by ripping apart his structure at a molecular level, albeit at the cost of his own legs and Wanda's life.

In the Ultimate Marvel, Shinobi Shaw appeared as Emma Frost's boyfriend. He is a member of the Academy of Tomorrow, in addition to the Hellfire Club. One of his operatives, Gerald Levine, is currently spying on the Xavier Institute and Marvel Girl, under his orders. When visiting the school, Shinobi and Gerald attacked Jean in an attempt to capture the Phoenix God. This failed, as the Phoenix fought back, and both Shinobi & Gerald were taken into police custody. Later, it is revealed that Emma's also a member of the Hellfire Club in secret.

Later in the Ultimate Comics: Ultimates, Tony Stark and Jarvis are seen leaving a party for Shaw in Tokyo to respond to an emergency by Nick Fury.

Other media 
Shinobi Shaw, among other Hellfire Club members, was originally planned to appear in Dark Phoenix, but was ultimately cut from the film.

References

External links 
 
 
 Marvel Directory: Shinobi Shaw
 UncannyXmen.net Character Profile on Shinobi Shaw

Comics characters introduced in 1991
Fictional businesspeople
Fictional characters with density control abilities
Marvel Comics mutants
Marvel Comics supervillains
Characters created by Chris Claremont